Kaj Nyström is a Swedish mathematician currently at Uppsala University and was awarded the Göran Gustafsson Prize by the Royal Swedish Academy of Sciences.

References

Academic staff of Uppsala University
Swedish mathematicians
Umeå University alumni
Living people
Year of birth missing (living people)